Benjamin Bourigeaud (born 14 January 1994) is a French professional footballer who plays as a midfielder for Ligue 1 club Rennes.

Career statistics

Club

Honours
Rennes
Coupe de France: 2018–19

Individual
UNFP Ligue 1 Player of the Month: April 2022

References

External links

 
 

1994 births
Living people
Association football midfielders
French footballers
France youth international footballers
Sportspeople from Calais
Stade Rennais F.C. players
RC Lens players
Ligue 1 players
Ligue 2 players
Footballers from Hauts-de-France